Emoryi may refer to:
Animals
 Apalone spinifera emoryi, a subspecies of softshell turtle
 Asclepias emoryi, a flowering milkweed plant
 Pantherophis emoryi, the Great Plains rat snake
Plants
Cacti
 Bergerocactus emoryi, the golden-spined cereus
 Ferocactus emoryi, a species of barrel cactus
 Grusonia emoryi, a species of cactus in the Grusonia genus
Other plants
 Carex emoryi, the riverbank tussock sedge or Emory's sedge, a plant species
 Castela emoryi, the Crucifixion thorn, a shrub species native to the Mojave and Sonoran Deserts
 Condea emoryi, the desert lavender plant
 Perityle emoryi, a flowering plant in the Astor family
 Psorothamnus emoryi, a flowering shrub species
 Quercus emoryi, a species of oak tree
 Sphaeralcea emoryi, a flowering plant in the mallow family